Michelle Ferris (24 September 1976) is an Australian cyclist. She won the Silver Medal in  Women's sprint in 1996 Summer Olympics and the 2000 Summer Olympics.

Her biggest rival was Félicia Ballanger, who beat her in the World Championships as well as in the Olympics. In the World Cup in 1997 she did beat her, making her one of only a few cyclists who were able to beat Ballanger in a big tournament.

In summer 2020 Ferris took on a role as Assistant Mentor Coach to the cycling squad at the Western Sydney Academy of Sport.

She is one of the few professional Australian athletes to come out publicly as gay, noting "Whenever I was interviewed after a race during my career, the journalists always asked me about my performance, no one ever asked if I was gay. If that question had been asked, I would have answered it honestly. I've never been afraid of who I am. But when you're talking about your race results, you're not going to add on at the end, 'By the way, I'm gay'." She has served as an ambassador for the Gay Games and stated she "can't say why so many lesbian athletes stay silent. But she says that while it was no secret she was gay when she won her silver medals at the Atlanta and Sydney Olympics, she never spoke about it publicly at the time."

Palmarès

Olympic Games 

  1996, 2000 2nd 500m

World Championship 

  1997, 1998, 1999 2nd sprint
  1995, 1996, 1997 2nd 500m

Honours 

 Added to the Cycling Australia Hall of Fame in 2018

References 

1976 births
Living people
Cyclists at the 1996 Summer Olympics
Cyclists at the 2000 Summer Olympics
Olympic cyclists of Australia
Olympic silver medalists for Australia
Australian female cyclists
Olympic medalists in cycling
Lesbian sportswomen
Medalists at the 2000 Summer Olympics
Medalists at the 1996 Summer Olympics
Commonwealth Games medallists in cycling
Commonwealth Games silver medallists for Australia
Australian LGBT sportspeople
Cyclists at the 1994 Commonwealth Games
Cyclists at the 1998 Commonwealth Games
LGBT cyclists
Medallists at the 1994 Commonwealth Games
Medallists at the 1998 Commonwealth Games